Rivalries in the National Hockey League have occurred between many teams and cities. Rivalries have arisen among NHL teams for many different reasons, the primary ones including geographic proximity, familiarity with opponents, on-ice incidents, and cultural, linguistic, or national pride.

The importance of these various factors has varied widely throughout the history of the league.

Early history

During the earliest days of the NHL, the league was limited strictly to Central Canada, and all cities in the league were in close proximity, making for bitter rivalries all around. In addition, Montreal had two teams representing its English-French divide. The "French" Canadiens battled the "English" Wanderers (and later the Maroons). Rivalries also existed with other leagues, such as the Pacific Coast Hockey Association. It was not until 1926 that the NHL took sole ownership of the Stanley Cup. By that time, the league began expanding into the United States, and new rivalries were created. Rapid expansion into the U.S. for a short time created a cross-town rivalry in New York City between the New York Rangers and New York Americans. The economic turmoil of the Great Depression and World War II, however, forced several teams to fold, with the result that by 1942 the NHL consisted of only 6 teams.

Original Six rivalries

From –, only six teams (the Boston Bruins, Chicago Blackhawks, Montreal Canadiens, Detroit Red Wings, New York Rangers, and Toronto Maple Leafs) played in the NHL. With only 6 opponents, teams played more frequently and games were often underscored by personal rivalries between players. These personal and team rivalries lasted for many years, as the turnover rate on NHL rosters was very low. At one point or another, during this era, all the teams had animosity towards one another.

Eastern Conference

Atlantic Division
The Atlantic Division was formed in 1974 as the Adams Division, which beginning in 1981 had all its teams in Eastern Canada and New England with the exception of the Buffalo Sabres, which are located in Western New York. The division became the Northeast Division in 1993, and then the Atlantic Division in 2013.

Battle of Ontario: Ottawa Senators vs. Toronto Maple Leafs

The Battle of Ontario is a rivalry between the Ottawa Senators and Toronto Maple Leafs. The teams compete in the same division and meet frequently during regular season games. In the early 2000s, the teams met four times in the playoffs with Toronto winning all 4 series.

Battle of the QEW: Buffalo Sabres vs. Toronto Maple Leafs

The rivalry between the Buffalo Sabres and Toronto Maple Leafs is due to the 100-mile distance between their home arenas (KeyBank Center and Scotiabank Arena respectively). The Sabres have won 72 of 110 all-time home games against the Maple Leafs despite the large contingent of Toronto fans at those games. Since the  season, both teams have played in the Northeast Division, now the Atlantic Division. Buffalo won the 1999 Eastern Conference Finals against Toronto in five games, the only playoff series between the two teams. The rivalry was added to in May 2015, with head coach Mike Babcock signing with the Leafs (who the Sabres were close to inking a deal with the day prior). In 2018–19, Toronto swept Buffalo in the season series for the first time ever. Buffalo had previously swept a season series with Toronto in 1979–80, 1987–88, and 1991–92. 

As of the end of the 2021–22 season, Buffalo leads the regular season series 120–74–18–10 with a 4–1 playoff record against Toronto.

Boston Bruins vs. Buffalo Sabres
The Bruins and Sabres have had a rivalry since the Sabres joined the NHL in 1970. These teams have met in the playoffs eight times with the Bruins winning the first five meetings in 1982, 1983, 1988, 1989, and 1992. Their 1983 series was most memorable when in game 7 of the Adams Division final, Brad Park scored the winning goal at 1:52 of sudden death overtime. The Sabres finally won in 1993, when they swept the Bruins in the opening round on Brad May's famous "May Day" goal called by longtime Sabres broadcaster Rick Jeanneret.

In 1999, the Sabres beat the Bruins in six games in the Eastern Conference Semifinals on their way to the Stanley Cup Finals, where they lost to the Dallas Stars in six games on Brett Hull's controversial goal. The teams met in the opening round of the 2010 Stanley Cup playoffs. The Sabres, who won the Northeast Division with 100 points and were seeded 3rd in the Eastern Conference, were upset by the 6th seeded Bruins in six games. In April 2013, the rivalry was set aside when both teams faced off in the Bruins first home game after the Boston Marathon bombing. Milan Lucic and the Bruins were also responsible for Ryan Miller's head injury in 2011, giving him a concussion but received no suspension.

As of the end of the 2021–22 season, Boston leads the regular season series 154–114–29–13 with a 25–20 playoff record against Buffalo.

Boston Bruins vs. Montreal Canadiens

The Bruins–Canadiens rivalry is considered by former Canadiens head coach Jacques Martin to be "one of the greatest rivalries in sports," along with the Yankees–Red Sox rivalry, Dodgers–Giants rivalry, Bears–Packers rivalry, and Celtics–Lakers rivalry. The two teams have played each other more times, in both regular season play and the playoffs, than any other two teams in NHL history.

In the playoffs, the two teams have met in 34 series for a total of 171 games, 11 series, and 60 more games than two other Original 6 teams, the Red Wings and Maple Leafs. The two teams have faced each other 9 times in Game sevens, more times than any other opponents in NHL history.

Boston Bruins vs. Toronto Maple Leafs

Both teams are Original Six teams, with their first game played in Boston's inaugural season in 1924–25. From 1924–2020, the two teams met each other in the 16 playoff series, and faced each other in one Stanley Cup Finals.

The rivalry has since been renewed from the 2013 Stanley Cup playoffs which saw the Bruins rally from a 4–1 third period deficit to defeat the Maple Leafs in overtime, 5–4, and advance to the second round. The Bruins and Maple Leafs faced each other in both the 2018 and 2019 Stanley Cup playoffs, with the Bruins winning both series in seven games.

Detroit Red Wings vs. Toronto Maple Leafs

While the Toronto-Montreal rivalry is one of the most famous in all of sports, the rivalry with the Red Wings is no less intense. This rivalry dates to the 1920s. As of 2017, they have had twenty-three playoff meetings, five in the finals. So fierce was the rivalry that when the New York Rangers reached the finals against Detroit in 1950, but could not play in their home rink, Madison Square Garden, because the Ringling Bros. and Barnum & Bailey Circus were in town, they arranged to play home games in Toronto, whose fans hated the Wings.

The rivalry heightened to a fever pitch due to an incident in the 1950 playoffs when Detroit's young star, Gordie Howe, mistimed a check on Toronto's Ted Kennedy and fell head-first into the boards, suffering severe injuries and needing emergency surgery to save his life. While Kennedy was exonerated by the NHL, Detroit management and fans accused him of deliberately injuring Howe. The result was a violent playoff series and increased animosity between the teams. The teams' proximity to each other – Toronto and Detroit are approximately 240 miles (380 km) apart, mainly using Ontario Highway 401 – and a number of shared fans (particularly in markets such as Windsor, Ontario) added to the rivalry. After the Leafs moved to the Eastern Conference in 1998, they faced each other less often, and the rivalry was more often found in the stands than on the ice.

The matchup became a divisional one for the first time in fifteen seasons, in the 2013–14 season when the Red Wings moved into the Eastern Conference, sharing their division with the Maple Leafs. The 2014 NHL Winter Classic was played between the Red Wings and the Maple Leafs at Michigan Stadium in Ann Arbor on January 1, 2014.

The rivalry might have heightened in 2015 with the signing of former Red Wings coach Mike Babcock as the new coach of the Leafs.

Florida Panthers vs. Tampa Bay Lightning

The Florida Panthers and Tampa Bay Lightning are both teams located within the state of Florida along Interstate 75, representing different geographical areas within the state. The two teams have played in the same division since 1993 (Atlantic Division from 1993 to 1998, Southeast Division from 1998 to 2013, Central Division in the pandemic-shortened 2020–21 season, and the new Atlantic Division since 2013, except the 2020–21 season). The rivalry has at times been recognized by an actual trophy, known variously as the "Sunshine Cup", "Nextel Cup", and most recently, the "Governor's Cup." The physical trophy has not been awarded since the 2013–14 season.

Despite joining the league within a year of each other, Florida found success first, with a trip to the Finals in just its third season. The Lightning eventually gained the upper hand, making it to five Eastern Conference Finals in the 2010s, while the Panthers fell to the bottom of the Atlantic; for much of this decade, the rivalry was considered dormant by sportswriters. The improvement of the Panthers in the early 2020s under GM Bill Zito, however, made regular season meetings far more competitive.

The teams met in the postseason for the first time in the First Round of the 2021 Stanley Cup playoffs, with Tampa Bay winning the series in six games; they would go on to win their second consecutive Stanley Cup. They met again in the Second Round of the 2022 Stanley Cup playoffs. This time, the Lightning swept the Panthers, sending them to the Conference Finals.

As of the end of the 2021–22 season, Florida leads the regular season series 73–50–10–19 while Tampa leads the 8–2 in the playoff record.

Montreal Canadiens vs. Ottawa Senators (original and modern)

The rivalry between Montreal Canadiens and the original Ottawa Senators & later the modern Ottawa Senators began, just like Toronto and Ottawa, in the early days of the NHL. The first National Hockey League game was between the original Ottawa Senators and Montreal Canadiens on December 19, 1917. Also, in 1927, the two teams faced each other in the second round, Ottawa won that series and they went on to win the Stanley Cup. The Canadiens and the modern Senators face each other often as they are both in the Atlantic Division and there is only a two-hour drive from Montreal to Ottawa via Quebec Autoroute 40 and Ontario Highway 417. The modern Ottawa Senators' first NHL game was held in Ottawa on October 8, 1992, where the expansion Senators beat the Canadiens 5–3. That victory was one of the only Senators' highlights of their inaugural season; they won only nine more games the rest of the season to finish with ten wins and 24 points (tied for the NHL's worst record with the San Jose Sharks; but San Jose had a better regular-season record, having won one more game – 11 to 10; it should also be noted that San Jose lost 71 games, one more than Ottawa's 70), while the Canadiens won their 24th Stanley Cup that season.

The modern Senators and the Canadiens faced each other in the playoffs for the first time in 2013. In that series, there were a large amount of controversial events. In game one, Ottawa's Eric Gryba laid out Montreal's Lars Eller in an open ice hit. After the game, the Senators' head coach Paul MacLean blamed Raphael Diaz for a suicide pass. Later, Canadiens' coach Michel Therrien responded and said that what Maclean said was a "lack of respect." Ottawa won that game 4–2; Brandon Prust later insulted MacLean after the game, saying that he doesn't care what that "bug-eyed, fat walrus has to say." In Game 3, there was a full line brawl between Ottawa and Montreal. And later in that game, Paul MacLean called a timeout with 17 seconds left in the 3rd period with a 6–1 lead. Michel Therrien called Maclean classless while Maclean responded by saying that he was protecting his players from Montreal's dirty play in that game. The underdog Senators eventually won the series 4–1.

Two years later, the rivalry was renewed in another playoff series. In game one, Montreal's P. K. Subban slashed Ottawa's Mark Stone — breaking his wrist — and Subban was later ejected. Senators' coach Dave Cameron called the slash vicious and said that Subban deserves a suspension. Ottawa's Clarke MacArthur called it a lumberjack slash, and Mark Stone said that he was being targeted all game. Meanwhile, Michel Therrien said that Subban did not deserve to be ejected and should have only gotten a minor penalty. The Canadiens won that game 4–3. The Montreal Canadiens won games two and three in overtime. Riding a 3–0 lead in the series, the Canadiens saw Ottawa win the next two games, before closing the series in game six with a 2–0 win in Ottawa.

As of the end of the 2021–22 season, Montreal leads the regular season series 81–62–5–15 while Ottawa leads 6–5 in the playoff record.

Montreal Canadiens vs. Toronto Maple Leafs

The Canadiens–Maple Leafs rivalry is the oldest in NHL history. From 1943–79, the two teams met each other in the playoffs 15 times, and faced off in five Stanley Cup Finals. While the on-ice competition is fierce, the Leafs–Habs rivalry is symbolic of the rivalry between Canada's two largest cities: Toronto and Montreal, and by extension its two major linguistic groups, anglophones and francophones and their status as hubs for English Canada and French Canada, respectively.

The rivalry is illustrated in the iconic Roch Carrier short story "The Hockey Sweater". Published in 1979, it recalls an incident from his boyhood in 1946, Sainte-Justine, Quebec, as a childhood Canadiens fan whose mother mistakenly buys him a Toronto Maple Leafs sweater to wear in his neighbourhood hockey games. It remains a timeless favourite in Canadian literature.

Notably, the Canadiens and the Maple Leafs have won the most Stanley Cups in the NHL, with 24 and 13, respectively. As a result of their success, they have the two largest fanbases in the entire league – both teams have an influx of visiting fans in their home arenas when they play each other. However, neither team has won the cup since the 1990s when Montreal won the cup in 1993, and Toronto all the way back in 1967.

Metropolitan Division
The basic structure of the Metropolitan Division dates to the 1974 formation of the Patrick Division, which from 1981 onwards would have all its teams in the Mid-Atlantic States. It became the Atlantic Division (not the same as the current Atlantic Division) in 1993, and then the Metropolitan Division in 2013. The Metropolitan division boasts several of the NHL's longest and most storied rivalries.

Battle of New York: New York Islanders vs. New York Rangers

The Islanders–Rangers rivalry, also unofficially known as the "Battle of New York", is unique among New York City's major league sports, as the Islanders and Rangers are in the same conference and division, guaranteeing plenty of matchups – similar to the National Basketball Association's Brooklyn Nets and New York Knicks, who between 2015 and 2020 also shared arenas with the Islanders and Rangers, respectively. Major League Baseball's New York Yankees and New York Mets are in different leagues, as are the National Football League's New York Jets and New York Giants, so the only meeting opportunities are during inter-league or championship games. The games are often characterized by more fights in the stands than on the ice. The New York Islanders originally entered the league as the "step sister" of the New York Rangers, but their 4 straight Stanley Cups in the early 1980s generated a fierce rivalry between the teams and fan bases.

Battle of Pennsylvania: Philadelphia Flyers vs. Pittsburgh Penguins

The Battle of Pennsylvania, which is the Philadelphia Flyers–Pittsburgh Penguins rivalry, began in 1967 when the teams were introduced into the NHL's "Next Six" expansion wave. The rivalry exists due to divisional alignment and geographic location, as both teams play in the state of Pennsylvania. In their 2012 Eastern Conference Quarterfinals matchup, the rivalry strengthened with several on and off-ice incidents resulting in suspensions and fines. Philadelphia took a 3–0 series lead, and by the fourth game the two teams had combined to score an NHL-record 45 goals. The Flyers ultimately prevailed in game 6, by which point the two teams had combined for 309 penalty minutes. At times, the rivalry has been considered by some to be the most heated in the league.

Battle of the Hudson River: New Jersey Devils vs. New York Rangers

The Devils–Rangers rivalry, exists between two teams in the New York metropolitan area. The two teams are called "cross-river rivals." This is because Madison Square Garden in Midtown Manhattan, where the Rangers play, is less than ten miles and across the Hudson River from the Prudential Center in downtown Newark (and previously, the Meadowlands Arena in East Rutherford), the home arena of the Devils. Travel between both arenas is easily accomplished by road (usually through the Lincoln Tunnel), rapid transit (on the Port Authority Trans-Hudson (PATH) train) and rail (along the Northeast Corridor). The teams have met six times in the playoffs; the Rangers have won four times.

Battle of the Turnpikes: New Jersey Devils vs. Philadelphia Flyers

The rivalry between the New Jersey Devils and Philadelphia Flyers is very intense in both New Jersey and Pennsylvania, sometimes being referred to as the "Battle of the Turnpikes." The Devils play in Newark, New Jersey, which can be accessed by using the New Jersey Turnpike and the Flyers play in Philadelphia, Pennsylvania, which is about twenty-five miles from the Pennsylvania Turnpike. The two turnpikes connect over the Delaware River on the border of Pennsylvania and New Jersey near Northeast Philadelphia and Burlington, New Jersey. Since the late-80’s, battle lines were drawn, with the Flyers maintaining a significant territory in southern New Jersey, particularly around the Philadelphia metropolitan area, while the Devils mainly dominate northern New Jersey and little fan bases spread across the south. To some Devils fans, it has always been a battle for territory and respect.

Since the conferences were realigned and renamed prior to the  season, the two teams have won the two highest numbers of division titles (the Devils 9, the Flyers 6). Together, the two teams' 15 division championships account for almost all of the 18 total Atlantic Division titles.

Columbus Blue Jackets vs. Pittsburgh Penguins
The Columbus Blue Jackets have established a rivalry with the Pittsburgh Penguins in recent history (as of the 2013–14 season). This is referenced in telecasts, news articles and online arguments between fans of the clubs. Games between the two teams are very physical, with numerous fights and post-whistle scrums. This rivalry is one of the NHL's newest, and primarily exists due to divisional and geographical alignments (Columbus and Pittsburgh are approximately 3 hours apart by automobile, via Interstates 70 and 79). As a result, it is not uncommon to see large numbers of visiting Penguins fans at games versus the Jackets in Nationwide Arena.

The seeds for this rivalry were planted when the Blue Jackets traded star forward Rick Nash to the New York Rangers for Brandon Dubinsky, the latter of whom has a personal feud with Penguins' star centerman Sidney Crosby. Furthermore, this was amplified by the arrival of longtime Philadelphia Flyers forward Scott Hartnell in Columbus, who has been involved in numerous brawls and conflicts with the Penguins during his time as a Flyer.
The 2013–14 NHL realignment saw the Jackets and the Detroit Red Wings move to the Eastern Conference, placing Columbus in the Metropolitan Division with the Penguins. Pittsburgh swept the regular season series against the Jackets, but Columbus, on the heels of a 93-point season, earned a wild-card playoff berth (at that time only their second in team history), facing the Penguins in their first playoff meeting in the 2014 Eastern Conference First Round, which the Penguins won in 6 games. The two teams met yet again in the 2017 Eastern Conference First Round. That series was won by the Penguins in 5 games, marking the second time in four years that Pittsburgh ended the Blue Jackets' season.
 
Despite these playoff losses to the Penguins, the Blue Jackets have in recent years gotten the better of Pittsburgh in regular season matchups, leaving the Penguins with a losing record versus Columbus over the past two years of play. Further intensifying the rivalry, the Jackets fired head coach Todd Richards early in the 2015–16 season, replacing him with John Tortorella, who has a long-standing disdain for the Penguins, dating back to his days as head coach of the New York Rangers.
 
Tensions between the teams further flared up during a regular season game at Nationwide Arena on November 27, 2015, when Brandon Dubinsky was penalized for a cross-check to Sidney Crosby, a hit which briefly injured Crosby and later earned Dubinsky a one-game suspension. Crosby would later return to the game; however, the Jackets prevailed 2–1 in overtime over the Penguins, a goal on which Dubinsky assisted. In an interview following Dubinsky's suspension, Tortorella would later go on to be quoted: "We're not going to whine here. Pittsburgh can whine. Pittsburgh whines enough for the whole league, so there's no room for any other team to whine. We'll just go about our business."
 
The two teams met for their second playoff meeting in the 2017 Eastern Conference First Round. Game 2 in Pittsburgh, won by the Penguins, saw an incident near the end of the game where Blue Jackets forward Matt Calvert cross-checked and subsequently broke his stick across the back of Penguins forward Tom Kuhnhackl, sparking a melee on the ice. Calvert would later be suspended for his actions. Pittsburgh would be victorious in five games, en route to their second straight Stanley Cup championship.
 
On December 21, 2017, in Pittsburgh, a scrum broke out at the end of the second period during a game between the two teams. Numerous penalties were handed out, including roughing penalties to Columbus defenseman Seth Jones and Pittsburgh forward Sidney Crosby, as well as a five-minute major to Columbus forward Boone Jenner, for a high-stick to Penguin star Jake Guentzel. The Penguins prevailed, 3–2, in a shootout.
 
As of the end of the 2017–18 season, Pittsburgh leads the all-time series 36–13–0–4 including a (8–3) playoff record against Columbus.

New York Islanders vs. Pittsburgh Penguins
The Islanders and Penguins have been rivals since the mid-1970s. These two teams have met in the playoffs six times, with the Islanders winning five of the six playoff series. In 1975, the Islanders won the next four games after the Penguins led their playoff series against the Islanders 3–0, becoming only the second team in NHL history (after the 1942 Toronto Maple Leafs) to win a playoff series after trailing 3–0. 

In 1982, the Islanders and Penguins met in the opening round of the playoffs. The Isles were the two time defending Stanley Cup champions and appeared to be on their way to the second round after winning the first two games at home outscoring the Pens 15–3. But when the series moved to Pittsburgh, the Pens showed that they were a different team on their home ice, as they avoided elimination by winning the next two games at home, sending the series back to Long Island. At home for the 5th and deciding game, the Islanders trailed 3-1 late in the 3rd period with 5:27 to go in the game. Just as it appeared that the Islanders two-year reign was going to come to an end, Mike McEwen scored to cut the Penguins lead to 3–2. Still trailing late in the period, exactly three minutes after McEwen's goal, John Tonelli scored a goal to tie the game and sent it to overtime. At 6:19 of the extra session, Tonelli scored the game winner to complete the comeback, giving the Islanders a 4–3 victory and a 3–2 series win. This scare by Pittsburgh would serve as a wake up call to the Islanders, who would lose just two more games the rest of the way en route to their third straight Stanley Cup. The Penguins would not return to the playoffs again until 1989, the fifth year of the Mario Lemieux era.

In 1993, the teams met the Patrick Division Final. The Penguins were the two-time defending Stanley Cup champions and in search of their third straight title. They had won the Presidents' Trophy with 119 points and were coming off a five-game series win over the New Jersey Devils in the opening round. Meanwhile, the Islanders who finished the season with 87 points, 32 behind Pittsburgh, were coming off a six-game series win over the Washington Capitals in the opening round, but the win came at a price. Pierre Turgeon suffered a separated shoulder on a vicious check by Washington's Dale Hunter after scoring a goal late in the deciding game. The teams split the first four games before the Pens won game 5 by a score of 6–3. Faced with elimination, the Islanders won game 6 at home by a score of 7–5. In game 7, the Islanders lead 3–1 late in the third period when Ron Francis scored to cut the lead to 3–2. Then, with one minute left in the game, Rick Tocchet scored to force sudden death overtime. Then at 5:16 of overtime, David Volek, who was a healthy scratch often during the regular season, scored the series-winning goal, ending the Penguins' chances at a three-peat.

On February 11, 2011, the teams engaged in a vicious brawl. In the game (which the Islanders dominated the Penguins 9–3) the teams combined for 65 penalties, which included 15 fighting majors and 21 game misconducts, resulting in a combined total of 346 penalty minutes. The two teams met in the 2013 Eastern Conference Quarterfinals, with the Penguins coming out on top in six games. Both teams met in the 2019 Eastern Conference First Round and the 2021 East Division First Round, where the Penguins were favored both times, the former despite being the lower seed, but the Islanders surprisingly swept the series in 2019 and defeated them in six games in 2021, marking the first time the Islanders clinched a playoff series at Nassau Coliseum since 1993 and the last time the Islanders have won a playoff series in the venue, as they moved to UBS Arena in the 2021-22 season.

As of the end of the 2021–22 season, Pittsburgh leads the regular season series 130–103–22–12 while New York leads the playoff record 21–14.

New York Islanders vs. Washington Capitals

The rivalry takes place in the Metropolitan Division. The Capitals and Islanders were heavy rivals during the 1980s and early 1990s, becoming intense once again in the 2018–19 season, when Washington Capitals head coach Barry Trotz signed for the Islanders after leading the Capitals to win the 2018 Stanley Cup.

New York Rangers vs. Philadelphia Flyers

The Flyers–Rangers rivalry is one of the most well-known of the league. They have met 11 times in the Stanley Cup playoffs, with the Flyers winning 6 times, and have been division rivals since the  season.

There is a long-standing bitter rivalry between the sports fans from New York City and Philadelphia, which are approximately two hours apart by car, also seen in the Mets–Phillies rivalry in Major League Baseball, the 76ers-Knicks rivalry in the National Basketball Association, and the Eagles–Giants rivalry in the National Football League. Games between the two teams at Madison Square Garden and Wells Fargo Center are often very intense, hard-hitting affairs, as each home crowd does its best to create an unfriendly, sometimes volatile atmosphere for any visiting-team fans.

New York Rangers vs. Pittsburgh Penguins
Both franchises have been part of the same division on four different occasions: with the Patrick Division from 1981 to 1993, from 1998 to 2013 as part of the Atlantic Division, since 2013 as part of the Metropolitan Division, and in the 2020–21 season as part of the East Division.

The Penguins and Rangers met in eight playoff series, with the Penguins winning five of them. Between 1989 and 1996, the two teams met thrice in the playoffs. The most memorable of those confrontations came in the 1992 Patrick Division Finals, in which the Penguins upset the Presidents' Trophy-winning Rangers in six games en route to winning the second of their back-to-back Stanley Cups. That series was best remembered for Lemieux breaking his left wrist following a controversial slashing penalty from Adam Graves in Game 2, and Ron Francis' overtime winner in Game 4.

During the early 21st century (2000s and 2010s), the Penguins and Rangers met four times in the playoffs, with each team winning two series each. Both teams, led by Sidney Crosby, Evgeni Malkin, and Marc-André Fleury (Pittsburgh), Ryan Callahan, Chris Kreider, and Henrik Lundqvist (New York Rangers) respectively, met in three consecutive postseason series from 2014 to 2016. In 2014, the Rangers came back from a 3–1 series deficit to win the series in 7 games, en route to making the Stanley Cup Finals. The defeat led to the erstwhile Penguins' Stanley Cup-winning coach Dan Bylsma being fired. In both 2015 and 2016, the two teams exchanged five-game first round series victories, with the Penguins eventually taking home the Stanley Cup in the latter year. 

In 2022, both teams met again in the first round. In Game 1, the Penguins defeated the Rangers after three triple overtimes, and Rangers goaltender Igor Shesterkin made 79 saves, setting the all-time Rangers record for saves in a playoff game and was the second most saves in an NHL playoff game. In Game 2, the Rangers bounced back from their overtime loss with a 5-2 victory. However, the Penguins went on to win Games 3 and 4 by wide margins to take a 3-1 series lead. The Rangers responded to both losses with a 5-3 bounce back win in Game 5 to force a sixth game at PPG Paints Arena, but Penguins captain Sidney Crosby left the game following a hit from Jacob Trouba. The Rangers went on to win game 6 with the same identical score to force a game 7 at home. In Game 7, Tristan Jarry returned from a foot injury, but the Rangers managed to win after winger Artemi Panarin scored the game-winning goal in overtime. This was the second time the Penguins blew a 3–1 lead against the Rangers, as well as the fourth time in franchise history that the Penguins have done so.

As of the end of the 2021–22 season, Pittsburgh leads the regular season series 135–119–23–16 and also leads the playoff record 27–17.

New York Rangers vs. Washington Capitals

The rivalry takes place in the Metropolitan Division. The two have been rivals since the Capitals joined the Patrick Division in 1979. The rivalry got particularly heated during the 1990s with these teams facing off in the playoffs three times in five seasons. The rivalry intensified even further in the late 2000s through to the mid-2010s, during which time the teams played one another in five playoff series over a period of seven years. Overall, the Rangers have won five of the teams' nine playoff matchups, including the last three.

Philadelphia Flyers vs. Washington Capitals

The Flyers and Capitals have been rivals through the 1980s, dating back to their days in the Patrick Division. In 1984, Mike Gartner lead the Capitals to a three-game sweep of the Flyers in the 1984 Patrick Division Semifinals for the Capitals' first ever playoff series victory, and in the process ending the careers of Bobby Clarke and Bill Barber, the last two players of the Broad Street Bullies era. The Capitals then trailed the Flyers three games to one in 1988 Patrick Division Semifinals. Washington would rally to win the next three games to take the series in seven games capped off by Dale Hunter's overtime goal in game seven. The following year, Tim Kerr and Ron Hextall helped the Flyers take down the division champion Capitals in the 1989 Patrick Division Semifinals, exacting revenge for their 1988 defeat.

In the 2000s, the rivalry was reignited by the rebirth of the Alexander Ovechkin-led Capitals, whom the Flyers eliminated in the 2008 Eastern Conference Quarterfinals in overtime on a power play goal by Joffrey Lupul in the seventh game, and avoid squandering a 3–1 series advantage like in 1988. Since the league-wide realignment in 2013, the rivalry between the teams has started to intensify. During a regular season game in 2013, there was an all-out line-brawl between the two teams. Washington would win the game 7–0. Both teams met in the 2016 Eastern Conference First Round, with the Capitals winning the series four games to two after winning the first three games.

Pittsburgh Penguins vs. Washington Capitals

These two teams played in the Patrick Division together from 1981 to 1993, and have been part of the Metro Division since 2013. In total, the two teams have met 11 times in the playoffs. Despite trailing in nine of the eleven series, Pittsburgh has won all but the 1994 Eastern Conference Quarterfinals and the 2018 Eastern Conference Second Round. The teams first met in the 1991 Patrick Division Finals, when the Penguins defeated the Capitals in 5 en route to capturing the Stanley Cup. In fact, all 6 Stanley Cups championship seasons combined between Washington and Pittsburgh (Pittsburgh has 5 of them), have involved a round against the other team. The rivalry was intense during the early 2000s when the Penguins beat the Capitals in the first round in consecutive seasons (1999–2000, 2000–01), and seemed to amplify more after the trade of Jaromír Jágr.

More recently, with the drafting and emergence of Alexander Ovechkin in Washington, and Sidney Crosby in Pittsburgh, the rivalry has heated up again, with controversial comments that Alexander Semin made about Crosby in the media and physical altercations taking place between Ovechkin and Malkin during games. One of the best series to date between the teams was the 2009 Eastern Conference Semifinals, in which the Capitals took a 2–0 series lead before letting it go once again to be downed in 7 games, ending with a 6–2 Game 7 loss at the Verizon Center. Just like in 1991 and 1992, the Penguins defeated the Capitals in the playoffs en route to the Stanley Cup. The two teams faced off at the 2011 NHL Winter Classic hosted in Pittsburgh at Heinz Field, with the Capitals emerging victorious 3–1, and a hit in the game resulting in Crosby missing nearly all of two seasons with concussion-related issues. Both teams completed their second playoff confrontation in the Ovechkin-Crosby era in the 2016 Stanley Cup playoffs with the Penguins winning in six games, again preceding Pittsburgh's fourth Stanley Cup title. In 2017, these two teams met again in the second round. Pittsburgh gained a 3–1 series lead only to see Washington win the next two games. The Penguins shut out the Capitals at Verizon Center in Washington, D.C. to advance to the Eastern Conference Finals and eventually the franchise's fifth Stanley Cup. The two teams met again in the 2018 Stanley Cup playoffs in the second round for the third consecutive year. The Washington Capitals defeated the Pittsburgh Penguins in six games to advance to the Eastern Conference Final, and eventually win the Stanley Cup.

Interdivisional

Boston Bruins vs. New York Rangers
The NHL's extension of the Boston–New York rivalry – present in the other leagues with the Yankees–Red Sox rivalry, Celtics–Knicks rivalry and Jets–Patriots rivalry – had its peak during the 1970s, but saw a resurgence in the 2010s. In the Original Six era, the teams had six matchups, with the Rangers only winning in 1928 and 1940 – both on the way to a Stanley Cup title. Between 1970 and 1973, where the Rangers' GAG line and the Bruins led by Bobby Orr and Phil Esposito had strong showings; the teams met three times, with the highest point being the 1972 Stanley Cup Finals, which the Bruins won in six games. However, the Rangers won in five games in 1973. 40 years passed before the next series between the Bruins and Rangers, and in 2013 the Bruins eliminated the Rangers in five games.

As of the end of the 2021–22 season, Boston leads the all-time series 304–252–97–12 with a 26–19–2 playoff record against the New York Rangers. The Bruins have won seven of ten playoffs series between the teams.

Boston Bruins vs. Philadelphia Flyers

The Boston–Philadelphia NHL rivalry, also present in the NBA's Celtics–76ers rivalry, dates back to and was most intense in the 1970s, but the rivalry renewed its intensity in the 2010s. In the early 1970s, both the Bruins and Flyers played similar styles that reflected perfectly on each teams respective city, with the Bruins being known as the "Big Bad Bruins" and the Flyers as the "Broad Street Bullies." The most vicious rivalry of the era hit its peak in the 1974 Stanley Cup Finals, with the Bruins, led by Bobby Orr and Phil Esposito, and Flyers, led by Bobby Clarke and Bernie Parent, in an intense grudge match. The Flyers would complete a stunning upset, defeating the Bruins in six games. The two teams would meet each other again in the semifinals in the 1976, 1977, and 1978 playoffs, but would not meet each other again in the playoffs until 2010. Prior to the playoff meeting, the two teams squared off in the 2010 Winter Classic at Fenway Park, with the Bruins winning the game 2–1 in overtime. When the two teams met in the playoffs that year, the Bruins stormed out to a 3–0 series lead, but the Flyers would complete a stunning comeback, winning the series four games to three, which also included overcoming a 3–0 deficit in the decisive game seven, and end up in the 2010 Stanley Cup Finals. The Bruins would get revenge the next season by sweeping the Flyers in the conference semifinals en route to their 2011 Stanley Cup win. In total, the Bruins and Flyers have met in the playoffs six times, with each team winning three series.

Western Conference

There are significantly fewer major rivalries in the NHL's Western Conference, due to this conference being much newer (its predecessor – the West Division – was created in 1967, while the conference was created in 1974) and only one of the conference's teams – the Chicago Blackhawks – predates the conference's creation. Geographically, its teams are generally spread much farther apart than those of the Eastern Conference.

Central Division
The Central Division was essentially formed as the Norris Division in 1974. From 1981 onward, it would have all the Central Time Zone teams in the US and the Eastern Time Zone teams not in the Wales Conference. It became the Central Division in 1993.

Chicago Blackhawks vs. Minnesota Wild

The Blackhawks–Wild rivalry started when the two teams met in the 2013 Western Conference Quarterfinals. The Blackhawks won in 5 games in that series. The NHL realignment that took place during the 2013 offseason placed Chicago and Minnesota within the Central Division, further invigorating the rivalry, and also rekindling the Chicago-Minnesota hockey rivalry that died out when the Minnesota North Stars relocated to Dallas in 1993.  However, the two markets have major rivalries in 2 other sports leagues; the NFL with the Bears–Vikings and the Twins–White Sox rivalries in MLB.   

The rivalry between the two hockey teams became even more intense with another playoff meeting between the Blackhawks and the Wild in the 2014 Western Conference Second Round. The Blackhawks once again turned out victorious, this time winning in 6 games. In the 2015 Western Conference Second Round, the Blackhawks and the Wild met once again. The Blackhawks won yet again, but this time, in a four-game sweep. The rivalry has sparked interest within the NHL, and during the 2015 All Star Weekend in Columbus, the League announced two NHL Stadium Series games and the 2016 NHL Winter Classic. Game one of the 2016 NHL Stadium Series featured the Blackhawks and the Wild at TCF Bank Stadium in Minneapolis, Minnesota on February 21, 2016. Minnesota won the game 6–1.

As of the end of the 2021–22 season, Minnesota leads the regular season series 49–29–1–4 while Chicago leads 12–3 in the playoffs.

Chicago Blackhawks vs. St. Louis Blues

The Blackhawks–Blues rivalry features the Chicago Blackhawks and St. Louis Blues. However, the teams were placed into separate divisions for the  season as a result of the COVID-19 pandemic. It is the most intense rivalry in terms of penalty minutes and fighting. At the height of the rivalry throughout the 1980s and early 1990s, it was common to go to a Chicago vs. St. Louis game and see a brawl break out. The most famous brawl of this era was the St. Patrick's Day Massacre. The rivalry cooled somewhat in the 2000s, but it heated back up in the 2010s, with both teams finding success in the early 2010s as well as Chicago losing the longtime division rivalry with the Detroit Red Wings as a result of the 2013–14 realignment. All six Sutter Brothers would play for this rivalry. In the 2010s, Chicago won the Stanley Cup three times and St. Louis once.

Pacific Division
The Pacific Division dates back to the 1974 formation of the Smythe Division, which from 1981 onward would contain the westernmost teams in the NHL. It became the Pacific Division in 1993.

Anaheim Ducks vs. San Jose Sharks

The Ducks–Sharks rivalry has been going since 1993 when the Ducks came into existence. The rivalry got heated when the two faced each other in the 2009 Stanley Cup playoffs. The Ducks won the series 4–2. Both teams met again in the 2018 playoffs, where the Sharks swept the Ducks 4–0 in the first round.

As of the end of the 2021–22 NHL season, San Jose leads the regular season series 80–59–4–16 with a 6–4 playoff record against Anaheim.

Battle of Alberta: Calgary Flames vs. Edmonton Oilers

The Battle of Alberta is the bitter rivalry between the Calgary Flames and Edmonton Oilers. The two teams are based in the cities of Edmonton, the provincial capital of Alberta, and Calgary, the province's most populous city. Most often it is used to describe sporting events between the two cities, although this is not exclusive as the rivalry predates organized sports in Alberta. The rivalry peaked during the mid-late 1980s, as from 1983 to 1990 the Western Conference only had two different champions, both being Calgary and Edmonton. They frequently played each other in the playoffs, with three series going 7 games. Edmonton won the Stanley Cup in 1984, 1985, 1987, 1988, and 1990. Calgary won the Stanley Cup in 1989. Calgary leads the all-time series with a 140–127–18–6 record, however, Edmonton leads in postseason victories with a 23–12 record.

Calgary Flames vs. Vancouver Canucks

The Canucks–Flames rivalry is a rivalry between the Vancouver Canucks and Calgary Flames. The two teams have played in the same division since the 1981–82 NHL division realignment.

Freeway Face-Off: Anaheim Ducks vs. Los Angeles Kings

The term Freeway Face-Off refers to a series of games played between the Anaheim Ducks and Los Angeles Kings. The series takes its name from the massive freeway system in the greater Los Angeles metropolitan area, the home of both teams; one can travel from one team's arena to the other simply by traveling along Interstate 5. The two teams have also faced off in an outdoor game at Dodger Stadium, in which the Ducks won 3–0. The two teams have met only once in the playoffs, during the 2014 Stanley Cup playoffs, of which the Kings won 4 games to 3. The Kings would eventually go on to win the Stanley Cup that year. The term is akin to the Freeway Series which refers to meetings between the Los Angeles area baseball teams, the Los Angeles Angels and the Los Angeles Dodgers.

Los Angeles Kings vs. San Jose Sharks

The rivalry between the Los Angeles and San Francisco Bay Area NHL teams began as a result of the 1967 NHL expansion, which established both the Los Angeles Kings and the California Golden Seals. At the time, the Kings and Seals were the only two NHL teams located west of the Mississippi River (the St. Louis Blues and the Minnesota North Stars were located on that river), and thus were created for each other to both reduce the amount of travel each team would need to do and to gain a foothold on the West Coast, previously the province of the borderline-major Western Hockey League, of which the Seals had been a member. The Seals were a historically unsuccessful team and left the Bay Area in 1976; the team ceased to exist when it merged with the Minnesota North Stars in 1978.

The Kings–Sharks rivalry started in 1991, when the San Jose Sharks were spun off from the North Stars and effectively reborn under the Seals' previous ownership. This rivalry really kicked things off with defeating the Wayne Gretzky era Los Angeles Kings 4–0 on April 28, 1995, destroyed any hope of a Kings playoff appearance. The Kings didn't get a definitive win over the Sharks until the  season, when the Kings' victory on February 17, 2003, at the Staples Center ended the Sharks hope of making the playoffs. The Kings and Sharks met in the playoffs for the first time ever in the 2011 Western Conference Quarterfinals. The Sharks were the #2 seed and the Kings were the #7 seed. The Sharks eliminated Los Angeles in six games with Joe Thornton scoring the OT goal that eliminated the Kings. In the 2011–12 NHL season, the teams competed for the last two seeds in the west with the Sharks ultimately securing the #7 seed while L.A. went into the #8 seed. San Jose was eliminated by the St. Louis Blues in the first round while L.A. steamrolled their way to their first Stanley Cup in the 2012 Stanley Cup Finals. The two teams faced each other again in the 2013 Western Conference Semifinals, with the Kings winning the series 4–3.

The Kings and Sharks met again in the playoffs for the second year in a row 2014 Western Conference First Round, further adding fuel to the rivalry in a series that turned out to become a surprising 7-game series. San Jose took home ice and stormed to a 3–0 series lead, winning on home ice easily 6–3 and 7–2 before edging the Kings at Staples Center 4–3 in OT. The Kings then rebounded to send the series back to San Jose with a 6–3 victory in Game 4 before winning on the road 3–0 in Game 5 to head back to Los Angeles. A 4–1 win in Los Angeles for the Kings brought the series to seven games, becoming just the 9th team in history to force a Game 7 after being down 0–3. Given the chance to become just the 4th team in NHL history to complete the unlikeliest of comebacks, the Kings won 5–1 in San Jose to win the series. In doing so, Mike Richards and Jeff Carter became the first NHL players to complete the comeback twice, both being part of the 2010 Philadelphia Flyers team that came back from 0–3 down to the Boston Bruins, of which Richards was captain. In February 2015, the two teams faced off against each other in an outdoor game at Levi's Stadium in Santa Clara. The Kings won the game 2–1.

Following a season where the Kings and Sharks missed the playoffs, both teams met in the In 2016 Western Conference First Round. San Jose won in 5 games.

As of the end of the 2021–22 season, San Jose leads the regular season record 91–62–7–12 with a 14–11 playoff record.

San Jose Sharks vs. Vegas Golden Knights

The Golden Knights–Sharks rivalry started during the 2017–18 season in which Vegas began playing. Both teams met in the playoffs in the 2018 Western Conference Second Round, which Vegas won in six games. During the 2018–19 NHL season, the rivalry became intense. With both teams set to play each other in the first round of the playoffs, the two teams met in a regular season game prior to the playoffs. The game decided home-ice advantage during that first round match up for which the Sharks won in overtime. In the 2019 Western Conference First Round, the Golden Knights took a 3–1 series lead. Game Three saw Golden Knights enforcer Ryan Reaves call out Sharks forward Evander Kane after the two fought each other. After a victorious Game Five at home, the Sharks forced a seventh game with Tomas Hertl's double overtime goal. Prior to Game Seven, both head coaches took shots at each other with Sharks coach Peter DeBoer calling out Gerard Gallant for chirping at players while Gallant responded by saying, "For that clown to say that in the paper yesterday is not right." In Game Seven, the Knights took a 3–0 lead in the third period, however, Vegas forward Cody Eakin was given a questionable and controversial major penalty for cross-checking which injured Sharks captain Joe Pavelski, (later forcing the NHL to introduce a new rule, effective the following season, to review all major penalties except for fighting from a monitor in a scorer's table; officials will reserve authority to reduce the penalty to a minor penalty depending on the result of the review). San Jose scored 4 goals in 4:01 on the ensuing power play to take the lead late, but with 47.0 seconds left, the Golden Knights forward Jonathan Marchessault tied it up to send the game into overtime. In overtime, Sharks forward Barclay Goodrow completed the comeback, ending the Knights season and propelling the Sharks into a second round matchup with the Colorado Avalanche. In a pre-season game between the two teams on September 29, 2019, multiple fights broke out, including two line brawls. The teams accumulated a total of 106 penalty minutes between them, with Sharks forward Evander Kane alone accumulating 27. Multiple game misconducts were given out and Kane was ejected for abuse of officials, being later given a three-game suspension.

On January 15, 2020, Peter DeBoer was hired as the head coach of the Golden Knights after having been fired by the Sharks on December 11, 2019, replacing Gerard Gallant, who was fired the same day.

As of the end of the 2021–22 season, Vegas leads the all-time series 25–7–0–4, including a 7–6 playoff record against San Jose.

Historical

Battle of California: Los Angeles Kings vs. Oakland/California Golden Seals (1967–1976)

The Los Angeles Kings and the California Golden Seals had a rivalry that existed between 1967 (when both teams joined the league) and 1976 (when the Seals moved to Cleveland and subsequently folded). The two teams were opposite ends of California. Located in Oakland, the Seals were known as the California Seals until December 1967, when they changed their name to the Oakland Seals. The two teams met in the 1969 playoffs, going to seven games. The Kings would be victorious in game seven, defeating the Seals 4–3.

The early 1970s were a tough time for both teams as they both missed playoffs from 1971 to 1973. The Kings were in last place in 1970. The Seals made the 1970 playoffs, but lost to the Pittsburgh Penguins. Later that year the Seals were bought by Charlie Finley, the owner of the Major League Baseball's Oakland Athletics, and changed their name to the California Golden Seals. The Golden Seals for struggled for the rest of their time in the league, finishing last place in 1970–71 and 1973–74. Bankruptcy issues came along as well. The Golden Seals last game was a 5–2 victory over Los Angeles in Oakland on April 4, 1976. That summer the Seals relocated and became the Cleveland Barons, and folded in 1978.

Another Battle of California did not happen until the 1991–92 season, when the San Jose Sharks came into the league. The Kings won the all-time regular season series 38–20–11 including a 4–3 record in the playoffs for a total of 42–23–11.

Battle of New England: Boston Bruins vs. Hartford Whalers (1979–1997)
The rivalry was first started before the two teams ever met on the ice when the Bruins "blocked" the WHA merger in 1979 because "the Whalers were in their territory." They first played against each other in the 1979–80 season with the Bruins flourishing during the season while the expansion Whalers played awfully that year. The Whalers have played the Bruins twice in the playoffs in 1990 and 1991, with the Bruins winning both times. The rivalry got to a heating point when the Bruins' Cam Neely and the Whalers' Ulf Samuelsson would fight on a regular occasion. It got to a point where Samuelsson hit Neely in the knees during the 1991 Stanley Cup playoffs, but Samuelsson was traded to the Penguins earlier that season. At the Hartford Civic Center, usually where the Bruins won, the Whalers fans would fight Bruins fans on Ann St. in Downtown Hartford. The rivalry ended in 1997 when the Whalers relocated to Raleigh, North Carolina.

Before the Whalers moved to Raleigh, Boston won the all-time regular season series (68–42–14), and the all-time playoff series (8–5), for a total of (76–47–14) against Hartford.

In 2018–19, the rivalry had a callback. The Hurricanes wore the Whalers Late 80's jerseys in two games against the Bruins, one in Raleigh, proclaimed as “Whalers Night” and one in Boston. The series was split 1–1.

Battle of Quebec: Montreal Canadiens vs. Quebec Nordiques (1979–1995)

The Battle of Quebec is the nickname for a former NHL rivalry between the Montreal Canadiens and Quebec Nordiques. The teams played against each other five times in the NHL playoffs, and the Canadiens won three of the series. One meeting, in 1984, resulted in the Good Friday Massacre, a game in which multiple brawls happened. The Battle of Quebec extended to politics, in which the Canadiens and Nordiques became symbols for rival parties, and beer distribution, as the teams were both owned by competing breweries. The Nordiques' departure from Quebec City to become the Colorado Avalanche in 1995 ended the rivalry.

Before the Nordiques moved to Denver, Montreal won the all-time regular season series 79–57–12, and the all-time playoff series 17–14, for a total of 96–71–12 against Quebec.

Buffalo Sabres vs. Ottawa Senators (1992–2008)
The Sabres and Senators had a strong rivalry after the 2004–05 NHL lockout, when both teams were vying for the Northeast Division title. Ottawa had the upper hand on Buffalo during regular season games, but Buffalo beat them in the playoffs. The best known game in this rivalry occurred on February 22, 2007, which included a large fight that included both goaltenders and verbal sparring between the two coaches (Buffalo won the game 6–5).
The teams have met four times in the playoffs, with Buffalo winning three series and Ottawa winning one. Ottawa also beat Buffalo in the final game of the 1996–97 season to make the playoffs for the first time since entering the league. With both teams struggling at inconsistent times, the rivalry effectively ended; however, both teams remain in the same division, and the rivalry could be renewed if another incident were to occur.

As of the end of the 2017–18 season, Buffalo leads the all-time series (80–58–10–10) including a (13–8) playoff record against Ottawa.

Calgary Flames vs. Winnipeg Jets (original) (1980–1996)
The Flames and Jets (the original incarnation and later the modern) rivalry is unique in the NHL. Both teams compete in the Western Conference, as they are both located in Western Canada. However, Calgary plays in the Pacific Division and Winnipeg plays in the Central Division (they played in the North Division in 2021). The Flames and both the original and modern Jets met in the playoffs four times (three straight years in the 1980s; the fourth in 2020), with each team winning two series. In 1985, the Jets defeated the Flames 3–1 for their first ever playoff series victory. The next season, the Flames got their revenge by sweeping the Jets in three straight games capped off by Lanny McDonald's overtime winner in the deciding game beginning Calgary's run to the Stanley Cup Final where they lost to the Montreal Canadiens in five games. In 1987, the Jets upset the Flames in six games in the opening round in what would turn out to be their final playoff series victory for the franchise until 2012, when they were known as the Phoenix Coyotes. This was also the last time a Winnipeg-based NHL team won a playoff series until 2018 as (modern).

The rivalry is based on the tradition used by their set of fans. Both the original and later the modern created the Winnipeg Whiteout by wearing white to home playoff games in Winnipeg, and the "C of Red" is used by Calgary Flames fans by wearing a red jersey with Calgary's flaming C on it.

From 1980 (when the Flames moved to Calgary) to 1996 (when the original Jets moved to Arizona), Calgary won the all-time series 57–45–16 (including a 6–7 playoff record) against Winnipeg.

Chicago Blackhawks vs. Detroit Red Wings (1926–2013; 2020–21)

The Blackhawks–Red Wings rivalry was the most intense in the Central Division during the post lockout era. These two clubs have faced each other in more regular season games than any other two clubs in NHL history, except the Bruins–Canadiens rivalry, which exceeds them in total games played when Stanley Cup playoff games are included.

Before the 2013–14 season, the Detroit Red Wings moved from the Central Division of the Western Conference to the newly formed Atlantic Division of the Eastern Conference, while Chicago stayed in the Central Division. This effectively caused the rivalry to cease (despite the two cities' proximity to each other), as the Blackhawks and Red Wings now meet only twice a year; the one exception being the 2020–21 season, in which the Red Wings were moved back to the Central on an interim basis. However, the rich history between the two teams remains very popular today, and some even consider the rivalry to still be in existence deep down, despite them now being in different conferences.

Chicago Blackhawks vs. Minnesota North Stars (1981–1993)
The North Stars and the Blackhawks played each other in the playoffs six times from 1982 through 1991. The rivalry was at its most fierce from the 1981–82 through 1984–85 seasons, when the teams played in four straight playoff series, with the Blackhawks winning three out of the four. In 1991, the Blackhawks had won the Presidents’ Trophy with 106 points and were among the favorites to win the Stanley Cup. However, despite Minnesota finishing with 68 points (38 behind Chicago) during the season, the North Stars upset the Presidents’ Trophy winning Blackhawks in the Norris Division Semifinals in 6 games, beginning their Cinderella run to the Stanley Cup Final before losing to Pittsburgh Penguins, in 6 games. It was the 2nd largest upset in NHL history in terms of points. The Blackhawks got a small measure of revenge the next year, when they dethroned the North Stars as Campbell Conference Champions. Just like the North Stars the year before, the Blackhawks lost to Pittsburgh Penguins in the Stanley Cup Final. The rivalry died in 1993, when the North Stars moved to Dallas.

Chicago Blackhawks vs. Vancouver Canucks (1974–2013)

For a period of five seasons between 2008–09 and 2012–13, this rivalry was considered one of the best in the NHL. This is mainly because there were three straight years of playoffs series between these teams in 2009, 2010, and 2011. The first seeds of the rivalry began with the realignment of the NHL in 1974, placing both teams in the newly formed Smythe Division. For two years, they battled each other for the top spot and in 1977, they went down to the wire for the last playoff spot, which Chicago won on a tiebreaker by virtue of having more wins at season's end.

The two teams met in the playoffs for the first time in the 1982 Campbell Conference Finals, which is best remembered for a mock surrender by then-Canucks coach Roger Neilson over what he deemed questionable officiating in Game 2, which began the Towel Power tradition in Vancouver and elsewhere in sports. Vancouver prevailed in the series four games to one, as part of their 1982 Cinderella Stanley Cup run. The Blackhawks swept the Canucks in the 1995 Western Conference Semifinals.

They did not meet again until the  season. The Blackhawks eliminated the Canucks in the playoffs that season in the second round and defeated them again the following season in the same round as part of their 2010 Stanley Cup run. The rivalry reached its peak in the 2011 playoffs, as they met for the third straight year in the first round of the playoffs that year, where the Canucks finally defeated Chicago 4–3. In this series, the Canucks took a 3–0 series only to drop the next three games. In Game 7, the Blackhawks tied it in the final minutes shorthanded, sending the game to overtime. In overtime, Canucks forward Alexandre Burrows scored on a slapshot to win the series for the Canucks, as part of their run to the 2011 Stanley Cup Finals, in which they ultimately lost in seven games to the Boston Bruins. The rivalry has died down since then due to the subsequent decline of the Canucks in the 2010s following their appearance in the 2011 Stanley Cup Finals, as well as a lack of playoff matches between the two teams.

Colorado Avalanche vs. Detroit Red Wings (1995–2003)

The groundwork for the Avalanche–Red Wings rivalry was laid well before Denver even had an NHL franchise, during games between Detroit and Quebec City. Once the Nordiques moved to Denver, the small rivalry still existed. In a regular season game between Detroit and Montreal, the Wings scored on Patrick Roy nine times, leading to Roy demanding a trade. Roy was eventually traded to Colorado and became a huge factor in the rivalry.

During the 1996 Stanley Cup Playoffs, Red Wings player Kris Draper was checked into the boards and severely injured by Avalanche player Claude Lemieux. Draper went to the hospital with a concussion and multiple broken bones in his face as a result, and he required surgery and stitches; he did not return to play until much later in the following season. This incident led to a series of on-ice confrontations during an Avalanche-Red Wings game on March 26, 1997, including a massive brawl near the end of the first period which featured Red Wings enforcer Darren McCarty (another member of the "Grind Line" and Draper's best friend) brutally beating up Lemieux as revenge for the incident with Draper, as well as a vicious goaltender fight between Patrick Roy and Mike Vernon. Both of these events were major reasons for the extremely sudden intensification of the Detroit-Colorado rivalry, which is regarded by many as one of the greatest and bloodiest rivalries in NHL history, and even all of sports.

The rivalry was largely predicated on the competitiveness of both teams in the late 1990s and early 2000s. From –, the teams met in five playoff series, three times in the Western Conference Finals. Out of those seven seasons, the teams combined to win five Stanley Cups and four Presidents' Trophies. The rivalry started to cool down after the 2002–03 season, with both teams falling in round one and Roy announcing his retirement shortly afterwards. The last playoff meeting between the two teams was in 2008, with the Red Wings sweeping the Avalanche 4–0 on the way to the Stanley Cup. The Red Wings joined the Eastern Conference in 2013 and the two former rivals now only meet twice a year. However, a stadium series game took place on February 27, 2016, between the two teams at Coors Field, which the Red Wings won 5–3, though the Avalanche came back in the alumni game the day before, winning the exhibition contest 5–3.

Detroit Red Wings vs. St. Louis Blues (1981–2013)
The rivalry began when the Red Wings switched divisions for the 1981–82 season and developed in the late 1980s when they had intense division battles. In 1988, the Red Wings defeated the Blues in five games in the Norris division final. The rivalry really heated up in the 1990s. In 1991, the Blues defeated the Red Wings in seven games in the Norris division semi-finals after overcoming a 3–1 series deficit. They met up in the playoffs three straight times between 1996 and 1998; the Red Wings won all three series. However, the Blues almost defeated the Red Wings in 1996. They held a 3–2 advantage and it looked like the Blues would upset the Wings in Game 6, but the Wings won the last two games including a double overtime victory in Game 7. This was also part of the 1997 and 1998 Stanley Cup runs. When the Divisions realigned in 1998, this was the most intense rivalry in the Central division as they had many division battles until the 2003–04 season. They met during the playoffs in 2002 in the conference semifinals. The Red Wings defeated the Blues in five games en route to their 2002 Stanley Cup run. The rivalry died down in the post-lockout era as the Blues entered a slump, only reviving as the teams fought for the Central Division title in the 2011–12 season. The Red Wings' move to the Eastern Conference in 2013 ended the rivalry for good.

Detroit Red Wings vs. San Jose Sharks (1994–2013)
The rivalry between the Red Wings and the Sharks began in the 1994 Stanley Cup playoffs, in which the upstart Sharks upset the Red Wings 4–3 in their playoff debut. Game 7 saw Sharks forward Jamie Baker score the series winning goal on the road. After the Red Wings returned the favor by sweeping them in the second round of the  playoffs, the rivalry further intensified after the Red Wings acquired Russian defenseman Igor Larionov in a trade with the Sharks, eventually forming the Russian Five core that resulted in them winning back-to-back Stanley Cups in 1997 and 1998. The 2011 meeting saw the Red Wings nearly overcome a 3–0 deficit only to lose in Game 7. However, the rivalry ended in 2013 after the Red Wings moved to the Eastern Conference.

Edmonton Oilers vs. Los Angeles Kings (1981–1993)
The rivalry between the Edmonton Oilers and the Los Angeles Kings began more or less the instant the Oilers began playing in the NHL in the 1979–80 season. Among the first-year Oilers' players included a young Wayne Gretzky, who instantly challenged for the Art Ross Trophy against the Kings' Marcel Dionne. In the end, Gretzky and Dionne were both tied with 137 points, but the award was given to Dionne, who had two more goals (53 vs. Gretzky's 51). It should also be noted that Gretzky played 79 games to Dionne's full 80. Gretzky remarked during a press conference at which the scoring title was awarded to Dionne that he had been taught "that an assist was as good as a goal."

The two teams did not meet in the playoffs until the 1981–82 season. That season, Gretzky shattered the NHL record books with the most points in a season with 212 (92 goals and 120 assists). The Oilers also jumped to the top of their division despite playing in their third NHL season and had the second best record in the league. The Kings, after an impressive 1980–81 season, slumped to having the fifth worst record in the 21-team-NHL. They only made the playoffs, being fourth in the same division as the Oilers, because the Colorado Rockies had an even worse record in their last season. This set the stage for the top-seeded, heavily favored Oilers to meet in the first round against the Kings. After a two-game split in Edmonton, Game 3 in Los Angeles began with a commanding Oilers 5–0 lead after two periods. However, in a miraculous comeback, the Kings managed to tie the game 5–5 in the third period, scoring the tying goal with five seconds left on a two-man advantage. The Kings won the game 6–5 in overtime. This game is often referred to as the Miracle on Manchester. The Oilers won Game 4 to send the series back to Edmonton for the deciding game in a best-of-five series. However, it was the Kings who upset the Oilers and advanced to the next round.

For the next two seasons, the Kings missed the playoffs completely while the Oilers competed in the Stanley Cup Finals in 1983 and won their first Stanley Cup in 1984. Both finals were played against the dynasty New York Islanders. The two teams finally met again in 1985, but this time the Oilers defeated the Kings in three straight games. The Oilers won their second straight Stanley Cup. They met again in 1987 under a new best-of-seven playoff format for the first round, and again the Oilers won, this time in five games, and again the Oilers went on to win the Stanley Cup.

The entire world of sports was shocked on August 9, 1988, upon the announcement of the Oilers trading Wayne Gretzky along with Mike Krushelnyski and Marty McSorley, to the Kings for two rising young players (Jimmy Carson and Martin Gélinas), three first-round draft picks, and $15 million in US dollars, in cash.

Gretzky led the Kings in the 1988–89 season to vast improvements. For the first time, the Kings had a better season record than Edmonton, finishing second in the Smythe Division over the third place Oilers. This also led to another first round match up between the Kings and Oilers. This time, it was the Kings, with Gretzky, against the Oilers, and the Kings also had home-ice advantage. The Oilers lead the series against the Kings 3–1, but Los Angeles won three straight games to win the series and upset Edmonton.

In the next three playoff meetings between the two teams, the Gretzky-led Kings were eliminated by his former teammates in four, six, and six games respectively. Edmonton also won another Stanley Cup in 1990 after sweeping the Kings in the second round.

After the 1990–91 season, the rivalry died down as players from the Oilers moved to other teams. Jari Kurri and Charlie Huddy rejoined Gretzky on the Kings and go on a playoff run to the 1993 Stanley Cup Final before losing to Montreal in five games. Mark Messier, Glenn Anderson, Adam Graves, Craig MacTavish, Jeff Beukeboom, Kevin Lowe, and Esa Tikkanen moved to the New York Rangers and won the Stanley Cup in 1994. Furthermore, despite being reunited in the Pacific Division prior to the 2013–14 season, the Oilers and Kings have not met in the playoffs until 2022, nor have been regularly competitive at the same time, thus keeping what once was an intense divisional rivalry dormant. When the Oilers made it to the Stanley Cup Finals in 2006 (lost to the Carolina Hurricanes in seven games), the Kings failed to make the playoffs. For the next 10 years after their playoff run, Edmonton did not make a postseason appearance, while Los Angeles won the Cup in 2012 and 2014.

Both teams met each other in the 2022 Stanley Cup playoffs, the eighth playoff series but the first in 30 years. The Oilers defeated the Kings in seven games.

Edmonton Oilers vs. Winnipeg Jets (original) (1972–1996)
The Oilers and the original Jets both started their existence in the World Hockey Association in 1972. There, the Jets dominated the Oilers winning the Avco Cup three times, while the Oilers were not playoff contenders. But, when they joined the NHL in 1979 (along with the Quebec Nordiques and Hartford Whalers), the tables were turned, thanks to an 18-year-old from Brantford, Ontario named Wayne Gretzky. From 1983 to 1988, the Oilers and Jets met in the playoffs five times, the Oilers won every one of them, losing only one game out of the 19 games played between the two on their way to the Stanley Cup Finals in 1983, 1984, 1985, 1987, and 1988; with the Oilers winning the Stanley Cup in the latter four years. Gretzky had been traded to the Los Angeles Kings by the time the two teams met in the first round of the 1990 playoffs. The Jets took a commanding 3–1 series lead and led Game 5 by that same margin. Eventually, the Oilers fought back to win the next three games and the series in seven. The Oilers would lose just three more games the remainder of the playoffs, en route to their fifth Stanley Cup championship in seven years. The rivalry ended in 1996 when the original Jets left Winnipeg to become the Phoenix Coyotes.

Before the Jets moved to Arizona, Edmonton won the all-time regular season series 63–41–8, and the all-time playoff series 22–4, for a total of 85–45–8.

Montreal Canadiens vs. Montreal Maroons (1924–1938)
 
The Montreal Canadiens and Montreal Maroons had a rivalry that existed between 1924 and 1938. Since 1918 no other team had been occupied in Montreal. The Montreal Wanderers had played for only six games before the arena they played in, the Montreal Arena, burnt down. The Montreal Maroons were meant to appeal to the English-speaking people of Quebec while the Canadiens were meant to appeal to French-Canadians. The two teams met in the playoffs for the first time in 1926 for a 2-game total-goals series. The final game had 11,000 fans packed in an arena meant for 10,000 as the Canadiens defeated the Maroons. The next year the Maroons would have their revenge as they defeated the Canadiens 3–2 in total goals. This would be their last playoff meeting before the Maroons eventually folded in 1938.

New York Americans vs. New York Rangers (1926–1942)
The New York Americans and New York Rangers had a rivalry that existed between 1926 (When the Rangers became an NHL team) and 1942 (When the Americans folded). The two teams played in Madison Square Garden; however the Americans were the first NHL team to occupy the stadium. Even though the Garden had promised team owner and bootlegger Bill Dwyer the Americans would be the sole hockey team in New York, fan popularity and ticket sales allowed the Rangers to come into existence, thus the rivalry was born. The two teams first met in the playoffs via two-game total goals series in 1929. Both teams struggled to score in both games as goaltender Roy Worters of the Americans shut down the Rangers for the most part, and the Americans struggled to find offense during the games. The Rangers would win the series 1–0 in overtime.

The Americans then struggled to make the playoffs only making it in 1936. Under the ownership of Red Dutton, the Americans made the playoffs in 1938 with a 19–18–11 record. Facing the Rangers for the second and final time, the Americans defeated the Rangers in three games with the help of veterans Ching Johnson and Hap Day. Once the United States joined World War II, both teams started to fade in terms of players; most American-born players went to fight in the war. The Americans folded in 1942 with the hope of coming back in 1946 after the war ended. However, the League reneged the promises made to the Amerks and cancelled the franchise. Owner Red Dutton was so furious at Madison Square Garden for not reinstating his team that he swore the Rangers would never win another Stanley Cup during his lifetime. This became true as the Rangers did not win the Stanley Cup again until 1994; Dutton died in 1987.

See also
 Major League Baseball rivalries
 Major League Soccer rivalries
 National Basketball Association rivalries
 National Football League rivalries

References
Bibliography
 

Specific

 
Rivalries